sujatha baliga (born 1970/1971) is an attorney and restorative justice practitioner who won the MacArthur Fellowship in 2019.

Biography
baliga was born and raised in Shippensburg, Pennsylvania. baliga attended Harvard University and the University of Pennsylvania Law School.

She is the director of the Restorative Justice Project at Impact Justice in Oakland, California. For her work there she was awarded a 2019 MacArthur "Genius" Grant.

She was one of two Oaklanders awarded the grant in 2019, the other being Walter Hood.

She keeps her name uncapitalized.

References

Year of birth missing (living people)
Living people
University of Pennsylvania Law School alumni
Harvard University alumni
MacArthur Fellows
People from Shippensburg, Pennsylvania
21st-century American lawyers